Indian Creek High School may refer to:

 Indian Creek High School (Wintersville, Ohio)
 Indian Creek High School (Shabbona, Illinois)
 Indian Creek School, Crownsville, Maryland
 Indian Creek Senior High School, Trafalgar, Indiana

See also
 Indian Creek Elementary School
 Indian River High School (disambiguation)